Eduardo Pardo (5 May 1953 – 13 February 2022) was a Bolivian economist and diplomat who served as ambassador of Bolivia to Cuba from 2021 until his death in 2022.

References

1953 births
2022 deaths
Luis Arce administration personnel
Bolivian diplomats
Ambassadors of Bolivia to Cuba
Bolivian economists
People from Chuquisaca Department
Socialist Party-1 politicians
University of Saint Francis Xavier alumni